Emylcamate (marketed as Striatran by Merck) is an anxiolytic and muscle relaxant. It was patented in the US in 1961 (US Patent 2,972,564) and advertised for the treatment of anxiety and tension. It was claimed to be superior to meprobamate, which was the market leader at the time. It is no longer prescribed.

A study of the drug's effects in mice was done in 1959. It concluded that at 50 mg/kg emylcamate gave a 63% decrease in motor activity compared with meprobamate's 32% decrease, a doubling in effective potency. The therapeutic index in mice was also established:

Emylcamate also has a faster intra-parenteral onset than meprobamate, 3 minutes compared with 35.

References

Further reading

External links 

 
 

Anxiolytics
Muscle relaxants
Carbamates
GABAA receptor positive allosteric modulators